was a Japanese samurai of the Sengoku through late Azuchi-Momoyama periods. He served as an officer under the Oda clan. At first, he was attached to Maeda Toshiie. After Oda Nobunaga's death during 1582, Nagayori fought against Toyotomi Hideyoshi.

After Katsuie met his death, Nagayori went on to serve under Maeda Toshimasa, and Hidenaga. Nagayori sided with Ishida Mitsunari during the Battle of Sekigahara, but ended up being defeated. Nagayori had Mitsunari executed to assume the responsibility for the event.

References 

Samurai
1544 births
1600 deaths